Cadia Mine is a series of large underground and open-cut gold and copper mines located in the Cadia Valley, about 20 kilometres south of the regional city of Orange, New South Wales, Australia. The mine has been developed throughout the 1990s and is a major employer in the region with an expected lifespan of several decades. Cadia is the second largest open cut mine in Australia after the Super Pit at Kalgoorlie. Large mineral deposits are also being uncovered from the more recently developed Ridgeway underground mine, and Cadia East underground mine, adjacent to the Cadia Open Cut Mine. The mine is operated by Newcrest.

Water and power supply 
In May 2007, due to the prolonged drought which was likely to adversely affect production in the near future, the company approached Orange City Council requesting to use some of the town water supply. Orange City Council subsequently agreed to allow a supply initially from Gosling Creek Reservoir and then if necessary from Lake Canobolas. The two main water supplies for Orange, Suma Park Dam and Spring Creek Reservoir will not be used. Cabonne Shire Council later offered to supply water from a disused quarry on Icely Road to the east of Orange. There was also a dispute in July 2009 currently in the courts between Orange City Council and Newcrest to the current rights to the towns treated effluent water that the mine has received for free since beginning its operations in the late 1990s. Orange City Council believes the mine has broken the original agreement it had with the mine due to the mine's recent expansion and development of Cadia East and Ridgeway Deeps projects, and now would like the mine to purchase the treated effluent water.

In 2021, Newcrest contracted 55% (about 650 GWh/year) of the Rye Park 396 MW wind farm to supply some of its power needs for 15 years.

Automation 
The Ridgeway Deeps mine site contains a large number of autonomous systems including Sandvik Automine for automating the underground loaders and Transmin Rocklogic for automating the rockbreakers.
Ridgeway materials handling system is automated by controllogix PLC and CitectSCADA.
Concentrator is automated by Yokogawa DCS centum VP. Cadia East underground materials handling system is fully automated by Yokogawa Stardom system. Yokogawa Centum VP graphics is used as the main operator interface.

Union involvement 
The employees at the Cadia-Ridgeway Mine are represented by the Australian Workers Union. They are employed under an enterprise agreement known as the "Cadia Valley Operations Enterprise Agreement 2012". The agreement was approved by Fair Work Australia on 23 November 2012 and will expire on 15 November 2016. The Australian Workers Union was nominated as a bargaining representative for this agreement. This was the first agreement that the union had involvement with Newcrest at the Cadia-Ridgeway Mine.

Work stoppages

Earthquake interruptions
In March 2018, production was stopped at the mine following the partial collapse of a wall retaining one of the tailings dams. Tailings were retained in the adjacent dam, but production was halted pending a solution to disposal or storage of future tailings. It was reported that it could take one to six months to put in place an alternative. A magnitude 2.7 earthquake had been recorded in the area the day before cracks were noticed in the wall. The mine had also been closed for 3 months in 2017 due to earthquake damage. The company subsequently obtained a permit from the N.S.W. Government to use the old Cadia Hill open cut pit for tailings storage and commenced to do so during 2018.

Ground water

On 22 July 2022, water from an aquifer entering a ventilation shaft caused all underground production to cease while visual and other examinations were undertaken. Underground production was affected for several weeks. Processing of ore stored above ground was continued.

References

External links
 Cadia Newcrest

Copper mines in New South Wales
Gold mines in New South Wales
Open-pit mines
Surface mines in Australia
Underground mines in Australia